Megachile willowmorensis is a species of bee in the family Megachilidae. It was described by Brauns in 1926.

References

Willowmorensis
Insects described in 1926